Julián García Vargas (born 1945) is a Spanish economist and socialist politician who served in different cabinets of Spain.

Early life and education
Garcia was born in Madrid in 1945. He received a degree in economic sciences from the Universidad Complutense de Madrid in 1968.

Career and activities
Garcia is an economist and healthcare expert by profession. He is a member of the Socialist Workers' Party (PSOE). He began his career in private sector and then joined public sector where he worked until 1986.

He was appointed health minister on 26 July 1986 in the cabinet led by the Prime Minister Felipe Gonzales and was in office until March 1991. As of 2012 he was considered to be one of the three Spanish health ministers who significantly improved health-care system of the country. He was appointed defense minister on 12 March 1991 in a cabinet reshuffle. He retained his post in the July 1993 reshuffle. However, Garcia resigned from office on 2 July 1995 due to press reports revealing that the military secret services (CESED) had been spying on individuals and public figures. Gustavo Suarez Pertierra succeeded Garcia as defense minister in a cabinet reshuffle.

After leaving office Garcia served as the special envoy of the European Union in Mostar, Bosnia, from November 1995 to April 1996 for the implementation of the Dayton Peace Agreement. He was the president of the Spanish Association of Defense Technology, Aeronautics and Space Administration (TEDAE) until his resignation in June 2013. He is the president of the Spanish Atlantic Association. He has been board member of several companies.

References

External links

20th-century  Spanish  economists
21st-century Spanish businesspeople
1945 births
Complutense University of Madrid alumni
Defence ministers of Spain
Health ministers of Spain
Leaders of organizations
Living people
Politicians from Madrid
Spanish Socialist Workers' Party politicians